Tibiosioma flavolineata is a species of beetle in the family Cerambycidae. It was described by Giorgi in 2001. It is known from Brazil.

References

Onciderini
Beetles described in 2001